The R328 road is a regional road in Counties Mayo and Galway in Ireland, connecting Ballindine on the N17 to Moylough on the N63.

The official definition of the R328 from the Roads Act 1993 (Classification of Regional Roads) Order 2006  states:

R328: Ballindine, County Mayo - Moylough, County Galway

Between its junction with N17 at Ballindine East in the county of Mayo and its junction with N63 at Moylough in the county of Galway via Irishtown in the county of Mayo: Doonmacreena Bridge at the boundary between the county of Mayo and the county of Galway: Garrafrauns; Castle Street and Barrack Street at Dunmore; Kippaunagh, Ballyedmond and Mountsilk in the county of Galway.

See also
Roads in Ireland
National primary road
National secondary road
Regional road

External links
 Route on Google Maps

References

Regional roads in the Republic of Ireland
Roads in County Galway
Roads in County Mayo